Ultan is an Irish male given name derived from Ulster.

People with the given name
Saint Ultan, Irish monk and saint
Ultan of Ardbraccan, Irish abbot and saint
Ultan Cooke, Irish chef
Ultan Conlon, Irish singer-songwriter
Ultan Dillane, Irish professional rugby player
Ultan Quigley, a fictional character

People with the surname
Lloyd Ultan (composer)
Lloyd Ultan (historian)

See also
Owltan, a village in Ardabil Province, Iran

English masculine given names
English-language surnames